"Computer Love" is a song performed by American funk band Zapp, issued as the fourth and final single from their fourth studio album The New Zapp IV U. Featuring vocals by Shirley Murdock and Charlie Wilson and written by Murdock, Zapp Band leader Roger Troutman and his brother Larry Troutman, the single  peaked at number 8 on the Billboard R&B chart in 1986.

Background
In an interview with Wilson, the song's idea was presented to him by Troutman, during a particular phone call around 3 am. A music video was also discussed between Roger and Charlie for the single. However, this did not come to fruition, due to opposition from the label that Wilson was signed to at the time. The fact that both singers were from rival bands played a hand in the opposition as well. However, the two maintained their close friendship, and would perform often the song together on stage.

Chart positions

Cover versions
In 1989, Janet Kay did a cover of this song on her third album, Sweet Surrender.

References

External links
 
 
 Computer Love: How Charlie Wilson & Roger Troutman created the idea and it became a reality

1985 songs
1986 singles
Song recordings produced by Roger Troutman
Songs written by Shirley Murdock
Songs written by Larry Troutman
Songs written by Roger Troutman
Warner Records singles
Zapp (band) songs